Privett is an English locational surname, for someone from Privett, Hampshire, England.

Notable people with this name include 
Cami Privett (born 1993), American soccer player
Darrell Privett, British TV personality
Frank Privett (1874–1937), British Conservative Party politician, Member of Parliament 1922–1923
John Privett, Canadian archbishop
Stephen Privett (born 1942), Roman Catholic priest and president of the University of San Francisco

References